Quivicán Municipal Museum is a museum located in the 19th avenue in Quivicán, Cuba. It was established on 30 January 1982.

The museum holds collections on history, weaponry, archeology and decorative arts.

See also 
 List of museums in Cuba

References 

Museums in Cuba
Buildings and structures in Mayabeque Province
Museums established in 1982
1982 establishments in Cuba
20th-century architecture in Cuba